Commercial Breakdown is a light entertainment show that shows humorous television advertisements from around the world and ran from 29 December 1989 to 3 August 2008 and aired on BBC One. British adverts were initially not allowed because of the BBC's Royal Charter (advertising is completely forbidden on the BBC), however presently, provided the adverts are not currently being broadcast, they are allowed. Many of the adverts were international which means they were not selling items on the British market.

Transmissions

Specials

Series

References

External links

1989 British television series debuts
2008 British television series endings
1980s British comedy television series
1990s British comedy television series
2000s British comedy television series
BBC television comedy
English-language television shows
Television advertising
Works about retailing